Alex Sushon, known by his stage name Bok Bok, is an English music producer, artist, and founder of the UK record label Night Slugs.

Night Slugs 
Sushon is the founder and label manager of London-based record label Night Slugs. Night Slugs emerged from the club night started by Sushon and James Connolly, aka L-Vis 1990, after they connected on MySpace.

"Bok Bok already had a solid grounding in sound-system culture; his interest was piqued by a DJ Slimzee mix in 2003, and then, as the grime scene evolved, he shied away toward raw, upbeat grooves from further afield: Baltimore breaks, Detroit ghetto-tech, the footwork/ghetto house hybrids in Chi-Town, and South African arch riddim constructions".

Bok Bok's first EP release, entitled Southside, was described as having "a muscular grime foundation with thick bass, bright synths" by XLR8R Magazine. In March 2015 Bok Bok paired up with London Keyboardist/Composer Sweyn Jupiter for  double A-Side single ‘Papaya Lipgloss’. The track was released on Night Slugs on 17 March. The sensual club mix fuses synesthetic keyboards and glossy electro-funk. In September 2015, Bok Bok embarked on tour across Asia. In July 2016, Bok Bok headed out on a summer tour across America, Europe, Asia and Australia.

Discography

Singles and EPs

Remixes

Mixes

References 

Year of birth missing (living people)
Living people
English record producers
Musicians from London